Begur is a small village in Gundlupet taluk of Chamarajanagar district of Karnataka state, India.

Location
Begur is located between Gundlupet and Nanjangud towns on the Ooty-Bangalore Road. Begur is 35 km from Chamarajanagar and 15 km from Gundlupet. There is a post office in Begur and the postal code is 571109.

Villages and suburbs
 Horeyala, 4 km
 Somahalli, 6 km
 Agathagowdanahalli, 7 km
 Kulagana, 9 km
 Nitre, 9 km

Transportation
There is no railway station in Begur. The nearest railway station is Mysore.

Highschool
 Gangadareswara Highschool
 Gowtham College, Bommalapura
 Little Flower Highschool, Begur

References

Villages in Chamarajanagar district